A distributed company, remote company, or remote-first company is a company where all employees are physically distributed and engage in remote work.

See also
 Distributed workforce
 List of remote companies

References

Remote companies